"Red Carpet" is a song recorded by Japanese singer Namie Amuro. It was released on December 2, 2015 via Avex Trax and her label Dimension Point as the singer's third consecutive non-album single, being supported by B-side track "Black Make-Up". "Red Carpet" was distributed in two physical formats—a standard CD, and a CD and DVD bundle—and was made available for digital consumption. The recording was written and composed by Matthew Tishler, Paula Winger, Stephanie Lewis and Tiger, whilst production was handled by Tishler. Musically, the track features guitars, synthesizers, keyboards and drums as instrumentation. Lyrically, the songwriting focuses on themes of self-confidence, empowerment and narcissism, and uses the title as a metaphor for life experiences.

Upon its release, "Red Carpet" received positive reviews from music critics, with them commending the production and pop-friendly delivery, and also highlighting the inclusion of "Black Make-Up". Commercially, it experienced moderate success in Japan, peaking inside the top five on both the Oricon Singles Chart and Japan Hot 100. An accompanying music video was directed by Hisashi Kikuchi, depicting Amuro through several streets at night, decorated by fairy lights. In order to promote "Red Carpet", it was used for a campaign hosted by Kosee, and was included on the singer's 2016 Livegenic concert tour in Japan and Asia.

Background and composition
On November 3, 2015, Amuro announced the release of a new single titled "Red Carpet" alongside its corresponding music video, and unveiled details about the inclusion of its B-side track, "Black Make-Up". This marked a return to Amuro releasing non-album singles, having previously made available for purchase "Tsuki" (2014) and "Brighter Day" (2014). The singer revealed that the track would premiere as the theme song for Oleo D'or, a commercial campaign created by Japanese cosmetic company Kosee. Additionally, "Black Make-Up" served as the opening theme for Japanese anime series One Piece: Adventures of Nevlandia (2015–16). "Red Carpet" was written and composed by Matthew Tishler, Paula Winger, Stephanie Lewis and Tiger, whilst production was handled by Tishler. The song contains backing vocals by Japanese recording artist Emyli, who previously worked on songs for Amuro in the past.

Musically, "Red Carpet" was described by Japanese journalist Kanako Hayakawa as a neo soul tune with elements of contemporary R&B. Similarly, CD Journal noted elements of neo soul and described its instrumentation as consisting of guitars, pianos and drums. Alex Shenmue, writing for Land of Rising, labelled it a "pop tune". An editor of Billboard Japan noted musical similarities to Amuro's previous singles "Baby Don't Cry" (2007) and "Love Story" (2011), and labelled the sound as an "upbeat neo soul tune". "Black Make-Up" was noted by critics as a "danceable" track that incorporates dance-pop and R&B elements. Lyrically, the songwriting of "Red Carpet" focuses on themes of self-confidence, empowerment and narcissism, with the line "walking on the red carpet" serving as a metaphor for life experiences.

Release
"Red Carpet" was released on December 2, 2015 via Avex Trax and her label Dimension Point as the singer's third consecutive non-album single. It was distributed in two physical formats—a standard CD, and a CD and DVD bundle—and was made available for digital consumption. All three formats include the two tracks and their instrumental versions, whilst the DVD edition came with the single's official music video and behind-the-scenes footage. The cover art for all three formats featured Amuro in front of a large red silk fabric, which resembles the aesthetic of a red carpet, wearing the same dress from the music video. Physical releases of "Red Carpet" included an extra lyric booklet, whilst pre-ordered versions through Japanese retail CDJapan came with a limited edition bonus poster.

Reception
Upon its release, "Red Carpet" received positive reviews from music critics. Alex Shenmue of Land of Rising awarded it seven points out of ten, labelling the sound more "mature" than her previous releases. Despite commending the recording's production, Shemnue did believe that the material was neither "breaking any boundary or reaching outstanding levels". Similarly, a member from CD Journal complimented the composition and its commercial  appeal, additionally highlighting the production of B-side track "Black Make-Up". An editor from Billboard Japan was positive towards the production and composition of "Red Carpet", and complimented the lyrical content for its "hero"-esque vibe.

Commercially, "Red Carpet" experienced moderate success in Japan. It entered the daily Oricon Singles Chart at number two, staying there for three consecutive days. Subsequently, it opened at number two on Oricon's weekly chart, accumulating sales of 25,866 copies and making it the singers lowest first-week sales since "Big Boys Cry/Beautiful" (2013). However, it also became her highest-charting release behind her triple A-side release "Naked/Fight Together/Tempest". It dropped to number 18 the following week, selling an additional 4,962 units in its final week inside the top 40. It spent nine weeks inside the top 200, and sold 30,828 units by the end of 2015; as of October 2016, "Red Carpet" has sold over 35,521 physical copies in Japan. The single opened at number five on the Japan Hot 100, at number three on the Hot Singles Sales and at number nine on the Radio Songs chart, all hosted by Billboard Japan. Additionally, "Black Make-Up" peaked at number 96 on the Japan Hot 100 chart.

Promotion
An accompanying music video for "Red Carpet" was directed by Hisashi Kikuchi, and was uploaded onto the singer's YouTube channel on November 19, 2015. It opens with Amuro walking through two large doors, wearing a coat-like dress; on the DVD editions of the single, a special customization function allows the viewer to change the colour of the dress. She strolls through several streets and sits down briefly on a small bench-seat, with several members of the public, including a young couple and small children. The second chorus has her gazing through a fashion boutique, admiring several pairs of heels. By the bridge section, sparks fall from the sky and are seen behind Amuro as she looks upwards. Whilst the final chorus has her dancing as the sparks fall, the visual ends with the singer walking up several steps and posing for the camera.

In order to promote the single, it was used for Japanese commercials and live tours conducted by Amuro. As aforementioned, "Red Carpet" was used as the commercial track for Kosee's Oleo D'or campaign, whilst "Black Make-Up" was used as the opening theme to Japanese anime series One Piece: Adventures of Nevlandia (2015–16). Additionally, the singer included "Red Carpet" and "Black Make-Up" on the setlist for her 2016 Livegenic concert tour in Japan and Asia.

Track listing and formats

Credits and personnel
Credits adapted from the liner notes of the single's CD and DVD release.

Recording and management
Recorded by Wataru Namifura at LAB Recordings, Japan in 2015; mixed and mastered by D.O.I. and Tom Coyne at Sterling Studios, New York City, New York. Management by Stella88 and Avex Trax.

Credits

Namie Amuro – vocals
Matthew Tishler – producer, composer, arrangement, songwriter, vocal arrangement/production, instrumentation
Paula Winger – composer, arrangement, songwriter
Stephanie Lewis – composer, arrangement, songwriter
Tiger – songwriter
Yuko Yasumoto – production co-ordinator
Andreas Öberg – composer, arrangement, songwriter, electric guitars
Sigurd Rosnes – producer, composer, arrangement, songwriter
Xing – composer, songwriter
Emyli – background vocals, vocal production/direction
Wataru Namifusa – recording
D.O.I. – mixing
Hisashi Kikuchi – music video director
Hirohito Fujiyasu – music video director, video producer
Takuro Iwagami – cinematographer
Takayuki Yaginuma – cinematographer
Eikuu Tamada – cinematographer
Shogen Yamamoto – light direction
Satomi Kurihara – hair and make-up artist
Akira Noda – stylist
Kohei Takeda – video producer
Toshiyuki Suzuki – art director
Jun Hirota – art director
Aiko Hayashi – designer
Tisch – photographer

Charts and sales

Charts

Sales

Release history

References

External links
"Red Carpet" at Namie Amuro's official website .

2015 singles
Namie Amuro songs
2015 songs
Avex Trax singles
Songs written by Matthew Tishler